Goose Pond may refer to a water body or surrounding land in the United States:

Goose Pond (New Hampshire)
Goose Pond (New York), Herkimer County, New York
Goose Pond (Queens), Queens County, New York
Goose Pond (Washington)
Goose Pond Reservation in Massachusetts
Goose Pond Scout Reservation in Pennsylvania

See also
Goose Lake (disambiguation)
Goosepond Mountain State Park in Orange County, New York